Tarvarus McFadden (born January 28, 1997) is a gridiron football cornerback for the Toronto Argonauts of the Canadian Football League (CFL). He played college football at Florida State, and was signed by the San Francisco 49ers as an undrafted free agent in 2018. He played for the Tampa Bay Vipers in the XFL.

Early years

High school career
McFadden attended American Heritage High School in Plantation, Florida. As a senior, he led his school to a second consecutive 5A state championship by tallying five interceptions, 41 tackles, six pass breakups, two forced fumbles and scoring five total touchdowns in four different ways (one pick six, two punt returns, one kickoff, one reception). He was named into 5A All-State First-team and American Family Insurance Florida All-State Team honors, named the 2014 All-Broward Defensive Player of the Year and to the All-Broward County Team, and MaxPreps Medium School All-American.

Recruiting
He was rated as a five-star recruit by Scout.com, Rivals.com, 247Sports.com, and ESPN.com. He was ranked as the nation's No. 3 defensive back in the class of 2015 by Rivals.com and 247Sports.com, No. 4 by Scout.com and No. 5 by ESPN.com. He was ranked as the nation's No. 13 overall player by Rivals.com, No. 17 by Scout.com, No. 19 by 247Sports.com and No. 47 by ESPN.com. He committed to Florida State University to play college football.

College career

Freshman season
As a freshman at Florida State in 2015, McFadden played in limited playing time and had only four tackles and one kickoff return for 26 yards.

Sophomore season
As a sophomore, he took over as the starter, finishing with eight interceptions on the season, tied for the most in the country and second-most in FSU single-season history en route to first-team All-America honors from the FWAA and Phil Steele, All-ACC First-team accolades, was one of five finalists for the Bronko Nagurski Award, which is given to the nation's top defensive player, and collected the Jack Tatum Trophy, given to the nation's top defensive back by the Touchdown Club of Columbus. He was also named first-team All-ACC and was also a finalist for the Bronko Nagurski Trophy. Along with his eight interceptions, McFadden also totaled 20 tackles, including three tackles for loss, and six pass breakups.

Junior season
McFadden finished his junior season, totaling 30 tackles, 10 pass breakups and returning a blocked field goal 63 yards for a touchdown against Delaware State. He also earned second-team All-ACC and was named to the preseason Chuck Bednarik Award, Bronko Nagurski Award and Jim Thorpe Award watch list.

Professional career

San Francisco 49ers
McFadden signed with the San Francisco 49ers as an undrafted free agent on May 1, 2018. He was waived on September 1, 2018.

Indianapolis Colts
On September 11, 2018, McFadden was signed to the Indianapolis Colts' practice squad. He was released on September 24, 2018.

San Francisco 49ers (second stint)
On November 8, 2018, McFadden was signed to the San Francisco 49ers practice squad. He signed a reserve/future contract with the 49ers on January 2, 2019. He was waived on April 29, 2019.

Detroit Lions
On August 4, 2019, McFadden was signed by the Detroit Lions. He was waived/injured two days later and placed on injured reserve. He was released on August 10.

Tampa Bay Vipers
McFadden was signed by the Tampa Bay Vipers of the XFL on December 22, 2019. He had his contract terminated when the league suspended operations on April 10, 2020.

Toronto Argonauts
On February 15, 2021, McFadden signed with the Toronto Argonauts of the Canadian Football League (CFL).

References

External links

Toronto Argonauts bio
Florida State Seminoles bio
 

1997 births
Living people
Players of Canadian football from Fort Lauderdale, Florida
Players of American football from Fort Lauderdale, Florida
American football cornerbacks
Florida State Seminoles football players
San Francisco 49ers players
Indianapolis Colts players
Detroit Lions players
Tampa Bay Vipers players
Toronto Argonauts players
American Heritage School (Florida) alumni